Samuel Alexander O'Steen (November 6, 1923 – October 11, 2000) was an American film editor and director. He had an extended, notable collaboration with the director Mike Nichols, with whom he edited 12 films between 1966 and 1994. Among the films O'Steen edited are Who's Afraid of Virginia Woolf (directed by Nichols, 1966), Cool Hand Luke (directed by Stuart Rosenberg, 1967), The Graduate (directed by Nichols, 1967), Rosemary's Baby (directed by Roman Polanski, 1968), and Chinatown (directed by Polanski, 1974).

On a 2012 listing of the 75 best-edited films of all time compiled by the Motion Picture Editors Guild based on a survey of its members, both The Graduate and Chinatown appear, Chinatown listed 31st and The Graduate 52nd.

Life and career
O'Steen was born in Paragould, Arkansas but raised in California. As a child in Burbank, he would try to make it onto the Warner Bros. lot hoping it could be an entree to work in the editing room. He was finally able to secure a position as an assistant editor in 1956, when he became George Tomasini's assistant editor on Alfred Hitchcock's 1957 film The Wrong Man.

As was typical at the time, he served as an assistant editor at Warner Brothers for eight years; his first credit as editor was on Youngblood Hawke  (1964), which was directed by Delmer Daves.

Within a year, O'Steen had become the editor on Mike Nichols' first film as a director, Who's Afraid of Virginia Woolf?. O'Steen was Nichols' principal editor for nearly thirty years, during which he edited twelve of Nichols' films; their last film together was Wolf (1994). 

O'Steen had been working as a principal editor for only three years when he edited Nichols' second film, The Graduate, but Patrick J. Sauer considers this film to be the epitome of O'Steen's editing:
 In his volume from the History of American Cinema series, Paul Monaco emphasizes the innovative aspects of the editing of The Graduate:

O'Steen directed seven films for television in the 1970s and 1980s, most notably Queen of the Stardust Ballroom (1975) and Kids Don't Tell (1985). He also directed one feature film, Sparkle (1976). His editing of The Graduate (1967) was honored by a BAFTA Award for Best Editing, and he was nominated for this award again for Chinatown (1974). He was nominated three times for the Academy Award for Best Film Editing, for Who's Afraid of Virginia Woolf (1966), Chinatown (1974), and Silkwood (directed by Mike Nichols, 1983).

In 1976, O'Steen won the "Most Outstanding Television Director" award from the Directors Guild of America (DGA). His film Queen of the Stardust Ballroom won the Outstanding Directorial Achievement Award in the category "Movies for Television and Mini-Series". He was also nominated for an Emmy award for "Outstanding Directing in a Special Program - Drama or Comedy" for his work on Queen of the Stardust Ballroom.

O'Steen was married twice and had four daughters. His memoir, Cut to the Chase: Forty-Five Years of Editing America's Favorite Movies, was published in 2001, shortly after his death. The book is written mostly as a transcript of O'Steen's responses to questions posed by his second wife, Bobbie (Meyer) O'Steen, with sidebars about individual films and filmmakers. Ray Zone characterized it as "one of the very best anecdotal histories of filmmaking in print."

Filmography (Editor)

See also
List of film director and editor collaborations

References

External links

1923 births
2000 deaths
American film editors
Best Editing BAFTA Award winners
People from Greater Los Angeles